WQCM (94.3 FM) is a classic rock formatted broadcast radio station licensed to Greencastle, Pennsylvania, serving Hagerstown, Maryland/Chambersburg, Pennsylvania.  WQCM is owned and operated by Alpha Media.

References

External links
94-3 WQCM Online

QCM
Classic rock radio stations in the United States
Alpha Media radio stations